Razdolye is a rural locality (a selo) in Tarumovsky District, Republic of Dagestan, Russia. The population was 1,146 as of 2010. There are 9 streets.

Geography 
Razdolye is located 15 km north of Tarumovka (the district's administrative centre) by road. Talovka is the nearest rural locality.

References 

Rural localities in Tarumovsky District